This article lists political parties in Senegal.
Senegal presently has a multi-party system.

Parties represented in the National Assembly

Other parties 
 African Independence Party (Majhemout Diop)
 African Party for the Independence of the Masses
 Alliance for Progress and Justice/Jëf-Jël (Alliance pour le Progrès et la Justice/Jëf-Jël)
 And-Jëf/African Party for Democracy and Socialism (And-Jëf/Parti Africain pour la démocratie et le socialisme) (Landing Savané, secretary general)
 Democratic League/Movement for the Labour Party (Ligue Démocratique-Mouvement pour le Parti du Travail) [Dr. Abdoulaye Bathily]
 Front for Socialism and Democracy/Benno Jubël (Cheikh Abdoulaye Dieye)
 Gainde Centrist Bloc (Jean-Paul Dias)
 Movement for the Liberation of the Senegalese People (Louis Jacques Senghor)
 Movement for Rebirth, Liberty and Development/MRLD ("Mouvement pour la Renaissance, la Liberté et le Développement") (Abdourahmane Sarr)
 Movement of Leftwing Radicals
 National Democratic Rally (Rassemblement National Démocratique) [Madier DIOUF]
 National Movement of Servants of the Masses
 Party for Solidarity and Development of Senegal – Sunu Party
 Party for Truth and Development (Parti pour la vérité et le développement) (Sokhna Dieng Mbacké)
 Party of Independence and Work (Parti de l'Indépendance et du Travail) (Amath Dansokho)
 Rally of the Ecologists of Senegal (Rassemblement des écologistes du Sénégal – Les Verts) 
 Senegalese Democratic Party-Renewal (Serigne Lamine Diop, secretary general)
 Senegalese Democratic Union-Renewal (Mamadou Puritain Fall)
 Union for Democratic Renewal (Union pour le renouveau démocratique) (Djibo Leyti Kâ)
 Union for Progress and Renewal (Doudou Ndoye)
 United to Boost Senegal (Wolof:Benno Siggil Senegaal'')

Historical

 African Autonomist Movement
 African Regroupment Party-Renewal
 African Regroupment Party-Senegal
 And-Jëf / Revolutionary Movement for New Democracy
 Bolshevik Nuclei
 Committee for the Initiative for Permanent Revolutionary Action
 Communist Workers League
 Convention of Democrats and Patriots (Garab-Gi)
 Democratic Rally
 Independent Socialist Republican Party
 Party for Progress and Citizenship
 Reenu-Rew
 Senegalese Communist Party
 Senegalese Democratic Bloc
 Senegalese Democratic Union
 Senegalese Liberal Party
 Senegalese Party of Socialist Action
 Senegalese Popular Bloc
 Senegalese Popular Movement
 Senegalese Republican Movement
 Senegalese Socialist Party
 Senegalese Solidarity Party
 Socialist Movement of the Senegalese Union
 Socialist Workers Organisation

Historical alliances
 Antiimperialist Action Front-Suxxali Reew Mi
 Popular Front

Historical local parties
 Casamancian Autonomous Movement
 Democratic Bloc of Diambour
 Democratic Regroupment of Kolda
 Independent Party of Sine Saloum
 Independent Party of the Community of the Cap-Vert Peninsula
 Labour Party of Sine Saloum
 List for the Defence of the Interests of Commune of Linguère
 Party for the Defence of the Interests of Kolda
 Thiesian Democratic Front

See also
 Politics of Senegal

References 

Senegal
 
Political parties
Political parties
Senegal